Saint-Christophe-le-Chaudry is a commune in the Cher department in the Centre-Val de Loire region of France.

Geography

Population

Sights
 The church of St. Christophe, dating from the twelfth century.
 The fifteenth-century chateau of La Forêt-Grailly.
 The medieval manorhouse de La Lande-Chevrier
 The abbey de La Mothe.
 A watermill.
 Evidence of Roman occupation.

See also
Communes of the Cher department

References

External links

Annuaire Mairie website 

Communes of Cher (department)